William Warwick Buckland, FBA (11 June 1859 – 16 January 1946) was a scholar of Roman law, Regius Professor of Civil Law at the University of Cambridge from 1914 to 1945.

Life
William Warwick Buckland was educated in France, at Hurstpierpoint College and the Crystal Palace School of Engineering. He entered Gonville and Caius College, Cambridge in 1881, graduating in 1884 with a first in the Law Tripos. Elected a Fellow of Caius, he remained a Cambridge academic for the remainder of his life. In 1920 he became a Fellow of the British Academy. He received honorary degrees from the universities of Oxford, Edinburgh (1922), Harvard (1929),  Lyon, Louvain and Paris. Among his best-known works on Roman Law is A Textbook of Roman Law from Augustus to Justinian, which became a standard text.

He is buried at the Parish of the Ascension Burial Ground in Cambridge.

Works
The Roman Law of Slavery: The Conditions of the Slave in Private Law from Augustus to Justinian (Cambridge: University Press, 1908)
Equity in Roman Law: Lectures Delivered in the University of London, at the Request of the Faculty of Laws (London: University of London Press, 1911)
Elementary Principles of Roman Private Law (Cambridge: University Press, 1912)
 
A Manual of Roman Private Law (Cambridge: University Press, 1925)
The Main Institutions of Roman Private Law (Cambridge: University Press, 1931)
Roman Law and Common Law: A Comparison in Outline (Cambridge: University Press, 1936) (with the collaboration of Arnold D. McNair)
Studies in the Glossators of the Roman Law: Newly Discovered Writings of the Twelfth Century (Cambridge: University Press'', 1938) (edited and explained by Hermann F. Kantorowicz with the collaboration of W.W. Buckland)

Footnotes

External links 

 

1859 births
1946 deaths
People educated at Hurstpierpoint College
Alumni of Gonville and Caius College, Cambridge
Fellows of Gonville and Caius College, Cambridge
English legal scholars
Regius Professors of Civil Law (University of Cambridge)
English legal writers